Belgium competed at the 2022 Winter Paralympics in Beijing, China which took place between 4–13 March 2022. Two alpine skiers competed.

Administration

Olek Kazimirowski served as Chef de Mission. He also served in this role for the Belgian delegation at the 2016 Summer Paralympics in Rio de Janeiro, Brazil, the 2018 Winter Paralympics in Pyeongchang, South Korea and the 2020 Summer Paralympics in Tokyo, Japan. Alpine skier Rémi Mazi was the flag bearer during the opening ceremony. Alpine skier Linda Le Bon was not able to attend the opening ceremony as her competitions began a day later. Le Bon was the flag bearer during the closing ceremony.

Competitors
The following is the list of number of competitors participating at the Games per sport/discipline.

Alpine skiing

Linda Le Bon (and her sighted guide and daughter Ulla Gilot) and Rémi Mazi competed at the 2022 Winter Paralympics. Pierre Couquelet was originally scheduled to be Linda Le Bon's sighted guide. Couquelet was not able to compete as her guide after failing a doping test due to an administrative error related to medication that he takes.

See also
Belgium at the Paralympics
Belgium at the 2022 Winter Olympics

References

Nations at the 2022 Winter Paralympics
2022
Winter Paralympics